John Nichols (November 14, 1834 – September 22, 1917) was a U.S. Congressman from the state of North Carolina between 1887 and 1889.

Nichols was born to Alsey and Charlotte (Broadwell) Nichols near Eagle Rock in Wake County, North Carolina. He attended the common schools and worked for six years in the printing trade. At age twenty-one, he studied at the Lovejoy Academy in Raleigh for a year, then opened a book and job printing business and published a newspaper.

Nichols was a leader in founding the North Carolina Institute for the Deaf and Dumb and the Blind, and served as its principal from 1873 to 1877. He was a revenue-stamp agent in Durham from 1879 to 1881, Raleigh's postmaster from 1881 to 1885, and then secretary and treasurer of the State Fair association.

In 1886, although he had long been a Republican, he was elected as an Independent to the 50th United States Congress, thanks to his support from the Knights of Labor. Nichols served one term of two years (March 4, 1887 – March 3, 1889), being defeated for reelection in 1888. On July 22, 1889, he was appointed chief of the Division of Mail and Files of the U.S. Treasury Department. He became private secretary to the Assistant Secretary of the Treasury on April 1, 1893, resigning just 2 months later on June 30.

Nichols returned to Raleigh, and served briefly in the office of the Collector of Internal Revenue from November. He was appointed United States commissioner for the eastern district of North Carolina on July 1, 1897, serving until his death in Raleigh in 1917. Survived by his wife Virginia and numerous children, he is buried in Raleigh's Historic Oakwood Cemetery.

References

Members of the United States House of Representatives from North Carolina
1834 births
1917 deaths
North Carolina Independents
North Carolina Republicans
Independent members of the United States House of Representatives
19th-century American politicians